Eastern Orthodoxy in Vietnam is represented by 3 parishes of the Russian Orthodox Church: one in Vung Tau, named after the icon of Our Lady of Kazan, where there are many Russian-speaking employees of the Russian-Vietnamese joint venture "Vietsovpetro", and also parish of Xenia of Saint Petersburg in Hanoi and parish of Protection of Our Most Holy Lady Theotokos and Ever-Virgin Mary in Ho Chi Minh City.

The earliest parish in Vung Tau was opened in 2002 with the blessing of the Holy Synod of the Russian Orthodox Church, which had been given in Troitse-Sergiyeva Lavra.

Russian Orthodox Church in Vietnam
The Chairman of Russian Orthodox Church's Department for External Church Relations Metropolitan Kirill (since 2009 Patriarch of Moscow and All Rus) was the first Russian Orthodox hierarch to visit Vietnam in November 2001. Headed by Kirill the delegation had meetings with the Russian speaking community and Vietnamese officials, and held church services in Hanoi, Ho Chi Minh City and Vung Tau (about 600 people were present)
 
Since that time representatives of Russian Orthodox Church from time to time come to Vung Tau to conduct the Eastern Orthodox divine service. 

In 2007, the mission of the Russian Orthodox Church organized Easter divine services in Vung Tau, General Consulate of Russia in Ho Chi Minh City and the Russian Center of science and culture in Hanoi.

In April, 2010, the delegation of the foreign relations department of the Russian Orthodox Church organized and conducted regular Easter services in Our Lady of Kazan icon parish in Vungtau.

Patriarchal Exarchate of the Russian Orthodox Church in South-East Asia was established on December 28, 2018, by its Holy Synod. Included in jurisdiction of that Exarchate new Philippinian-Vietnamese eparchy (Diocese) contains 3 parishes in Vietnam:

 Parish of Our Lady of Kazan in Vung Tau (established in 2002),
 Parish of Xenia of Saint Petersburg in Hanoi (established in 2019),
 Parish of Protection of Our Most Holy Lady Theotokos and Ever-Virgin Mary in Ho Chi Minh city (established in 2019).

Metropolitan of Khanty-Mansiysk and Surgut Paul (Pavel Fokin) is governing hierarch of the Philippinian-Vietnamese eparchy (by February 2020).

Other Eastern Orthodox Churches
Vietnam is also mentioned as territory under the jurisdiction of the Orthodox Metropolitanate of Hong Kong and Southeast Asia (Ecumenical Patriarchate of Constantinople), though there is no information on its organized activities there.

References

Christianity in Vietnam
Religion in Vietnam